Criminal Law is a 1988 American legal thriller film directed by Martin Campbell and starring Gary Oldman and Kevin Bacon. It received generally negative reviews.

Plot
Gary Oldman plays Ben Chase, a brash young defense attorney whose success is built on his willingness to manipulate the judicial system for the benefit of his clients. In spite of his career success as an attorney, Ben is starting to show signs of serious alcoholism.  When he successfully defends Martin Thiel, the scion of a wealthy, prominent family, against a murder charge, the game turns on him.
  
Martin lures Ben to the scene of another murder and retains Ben to defend him, even before he is charged. Knowing his client is guilty, Ben struggles at last with the reality of his ethics, until he resolves to oppose Martin secretly, hoping he will incriminate himself.

As Martin’s ultimate plan unfolds, both he and Ben will be forced to reexamine everything they hold to be true.

Cast
 Gary Oldman as Ben Chase
 Kevin Bacon as Martin Thiel
 Tess Harper as Detective Stillwell
 Karen Young as Ellen Faulkner
 Joe Don Baker as Detective Mesel
 Sean McCann as Jacob Fischer
 Ron Lea as Gary Hull
 Michael Sinelnikoff as Professor Clemtes
 Elizabeth Shepherd as Dr. Thiel

Reception
Roger Ebert wrote: "Criminal Law is a textbook example of a movie going wrong before our very eyes, because of the curious failure of the filmmakers to realize that you can toy with an audience only so long before the audience grows resentful... It's a shame such good performances were lost by the runaway use of gimmicks."

Variety commended the work of Oldman and Bacon, but criticized the story's "ill-defined pretensions as an essay on the American legal system and a herky-jerky continuity that's fatiguing instead of tingling".

Kevin Thomas felt that Criminal Law "proceeds from one weakness to another", but described Oldman as "electrifying".

Peter Travers was less impressed by Oldman's performance, writing: "Oldman is a powerhouse. Just catch him in Sid and Nancy or Prick Up Your Ears. But what's a British actor doing playing a Harvard attorney in a Boston-based movie shot in Montreal? Flailing about like a drowning man, that's what. Oldman's [accent is] laughably in-and-out." He had additional criticism for the film's "overwrought script" and lack of logic and subtlety.

Slightly more favorable was Linda Rasmussen of AllMovie, who wrote that Oldman "gives an excellent performance", described Bacon as "intriguing and ambiguous", and praised the direction and action sequences. She concluded: "Criminal Law, if not taken very seriously and with more than a grain of salt, can be entertaining, but it fails miserably when compared to accurate, exciting legal thrillers such as Primal Fear.
 
On Rotten Tomatoes the film has an approval rating of 33% based on reviews from 9 critics, with an average score of 4.6/10.

References

External links
 
 
 
 
 

1988 films
1980s crime thriller films
1980s legal films
1988 independent films
American crime thriller films
American independent films
American legal films
American courtroom films
Films directed by Martin Campbell
Films scored by Jerry Goldsmith
Legal thriller films
American neo-noir films
American serial killer films
Matricide in fiction
1980s English-language films
1980s American films